Cricket in Denmark dates back to the mid 19th century, with the first club being formed in 1865 by English railway engineers. The first organised match was played the following year between two teams of English players, with the first matches involving Danish players taking place in 1866.  Today the sport is a minority sport within Denmark, which has an active men's team which used to play in the English domestic one-day cricket competition which carried List A status.  There was formerly a women's team which occasionally played Women's One Day Internationals, but this team is now defunct.  The grounds in this list have held one of the above-mentioned formats.

References

External links
Cricket grounds in Denmark at CricketArchive

Cricket grounds
Denmark